Ecuador competed at the 2022 World Games held in Birmingham, United States from 7 to 17 July 2022. Athletes representing Ecuador won one gold medal and three bronze medals. The country finished in 44th place in the medal table.

Medalists

Competitors
The following is the list of number of competitors in the Games.

Cue sports

Ecuador competed in cue sports.

Finswimming

Ecuador competed in finswimming.

Powerlifting

Ecuador competed in powerlifting.

Racquetball

Ecuador competed in racquetball.

Road speed skating

Ecuador won one gold medal in road speed skating.

Sport climbing

Ecuador competed in sport climbing.

Squash

Ecuador competed in squash.

Track speed skating

Ecuador won three bronze medals in track speed skating.

References

Nations at the 2022 World Games
2022
World Games